Görlitz is a town on German-Polish border, divided after World War II between Germany (Görlitz) and Poland (Zgorzelec) 

Görlitz also refers to:
 Andreas Görlitz (born 1982), German footballer
 Michael Görlitz (born 1987), German footballer
 Gorlitz, Saskatchewan, hamlet in Canada